James Welsh Kilgannon (15 August 1937 – 24 July 2000) was a Scottish footballer who played for Falkirk, Stirling Albion, Montrose, Dumbarton, East Stirling, ES Clydebank, Berwick Rangers and Alloa Athletic.

References

1937 births
2000 deaths
Scottish footballers
Dumbarton F.C. players
Falkirk F.C. players
Stirling Albion F.C. players
Montrose F.C. players
East Stirlingshire F.C. players
Berwick Rangers F.C. players
Alloa Athletic F.C. players
Scottish Football League players
Association football wing halves